The winners of Premios Oye! from 2002 to 2013

2002
 Main Spanish Record of the Year: Sin Bandera, Sin Bandera
 Main Spanish Song of the Year: A Dios le Pido, Juanes
 Main Spanish Breakthrough of the Year: Sin Bandera, Sin Bandera
 Latin Pop Male: MTV Unplugged, Alejandro Sanz
 Latin Pop Female: Laundry Service, Shakira
 Latin Pop Group: Sin Bandera, Sin Bandera
 Latin Rock Soloist or Group: Elefante, Elefante
 Main English Male: Lenny, Lenny Kravitz
 Main English Female: Laundry Service, Shakira
 Main English Group: Tie between Rock Steady, No Doubt & World Of Our Own, Westlife
 Popular Norteño Soloist or Group: Sueños, Intocable
 Popular Grupero Soloist or Group: Los Tucanes de Tijuana
 Popular Banda Soloist or Group: Contigo por Siempre, Banda el Recodo
 Popular Tropical Soloist or Group: Grandes Éxitos, Chocolate
 Special Tribute to Trajectory: José José
 Premio Social a la Música: Maná

Special Awards
 International Artist of the Century: Paul McCartney
 International Trajectory in Mexico: Bon Jovi
 Pepsi Oye 2002 Award: Paulina Rubio

2003
 Main Spanish Record of the Year: Revolución De Amor, Maná
 Main Spanish Song of the Year: Caraluna, Bacilos
 Main Spanish Breakthrough of the Year: Yahir, Yahir
 Latin Pop Male: Corazón Latino, David Bisbal
 Latin Pop Female: Frágil, Ana Torroja
 Latin Pop Group: Caraluna, Bacilos
 Latin Rock Soloist or Group: Revolución De Amor, Maná
 Main English Record of the Year: A Rush of Blood to the Head, Coldplay
 Main English Song of the Year: The Game Of Love, Santana & Michelle Branch
 Main English Male: Escapology, Robbie Williams
 Main English Female: Let Go, Avril Lavigne
 Main English Group: A Rush of Blood to the Head, Coldplay
 Main English Breakthrough of the Year: Let Go, Avril Lavigne
 Popular Record of the Year: Con Orgullo por Herencia, Pepe Aguilar
 Popular Song of the Year: Niña Amada Mía, Alejandro Fernández
 Popular Breakthrough of the Year: Nadia, Nadia
 Popular Norteño Soloist or Group: Nuestro Destino Estaba Escrito, Intocable
 Popular Grupero Soloist or Group: -, Marco Antonio Solís
 Popular Ranchero Soloist or Group: Niña Amada Mía, Alejandro Fernández
 Popular Banda/Duranguense Soloist or Group: -, Banda el Recodo
 Popular Tropical Soloist or Group: -, Margarita "La Diosa de la Cumbia"
 Special Tribute to Trajectory: Los Tigres del Norte
 Premio Social a la Música: Benny Ibarra

2004
 Main Spanish Record of the Year: Sí, Julieta Venegas
 Main Spanish Song of the Year: Andar Conmigo, Julieta Venegas
 Main Spanish Breakthrough of the Year: Aerosoul, Kalimba
 Latin Pop Male: 111 Ciento Once, Tiziano Ferro
 Latin Pop Female: Belinda, Belinda
 Latin Pop Group: De Viaje, Sin Bandera
 Latin Rock Soloist or Group: Sí, Julieta Venegas
 Infantil Spanish Soloist or Group: Alegrijes y Rebujos, Alegrijes y Rebujos
 Main English Record of the Year: Under My Skin, Avril Lavigne
 Main English Song of the Year: This Love, Maroon 5
 Main English Breakthrough of the Year: Songs About Jane, Maroon 5
 Popular Record of the Year: Con Orgullo por Herencia, Pepe Aguilar
 Popular Song of the Year: Mesa Que Más Aplauda, Climax
 Popular Breakthrough of the Year: Victor García, Víctor García
 Popular Norteño Soloist or Group: Nuestro Destino Estaba Escrito, Intocable
 Popular Grupero Soloist or Group: Que Amarren a Cupido, Joan Sebastian
 Popular Ranchero Soloist or Group: Con Orgullo por Herencia, Pepe Aguilar
 Popular Banda/Duranguense Soloist or Group: Hay Amor, Banda el Recodo
 Popular Tropical Soloist or Group: Za Za Za, Climax
 Video of the Year: Duele el Amor, Aleks Syntek & Ana Torroja
 Special Tribute to Trajectory: Antonio Aguilar
 Premio Social a la Música: Claudio Yarto

2005
 Main Spanish Record of the Year: A Corazón Abierto, Alejandro Fernández
 Main Spanish Song of the Year: Tie between Muriendo Lento, Moderatto & Belinda and La Camisa Negra, Juanes
 Main Spanish Breakthrough of the Year: Rebelde, RBD
 Latin Pop Male: A Corazón Abierto, Alejandro Fernández
 Latin Pop Female: Fijación Oral Vol. 1, Shakira
 Latin Pop Group: Rebelde, RBD
 Latin Rock Soloist or Group: Detector de Metal, Moderatto
 Infantil Spanish Soloist or Group: Código F.A.M.A. 3, Código F.A.M.A.
 Main English Record of the Year: X&Y, Coldplay
 Main English Song of the Year: Radio, Robbie Williams
 Main English Breakthrough of the Year: Love. Angel. Music. Baby., Gwen Stefani
 Popular Record of the Year: Hay Amor, Banda el Recodo
 Popular Song of the Year: Na Na Na (Dulce Niña), A.B. Quintanilla & Kumbia Kings
 Popular Breakthrough of the Year: Si No Existieras, Banda Los Recoditos
 Popular Norteño Soloist or Group: X (10), Intocable
 Popular Grupero Soloist or Group: Razón de Sobra, Marco Antonio Solís
 Popular Ranchero Soloist or Group: México En La Piel, Luis Miguel
 Popular Banda/Duranguense Soloist or Group: Hay Amor, Banda el Recodo
 Popular Tropical Soloist or Group: Fuego, A.B. Quintanilla & Kumbia Kings
 Video of the Year: Na Na Na (Dulce Niña), A.B. Quintanilla & Kumbia Kings
 Special Tribute to Trajectory: Banda el Recodo and Rocío Dúrcal
 Premio Social a la Música: Juanes

Special Awards
 New values for music: Belanova, Reik and Lu

2006
 Main Spanish Record of the Year: Indeleble, Alejandra Guzmán
 Main Spanish Song of the Year: Hips Don't Lie(Spanish version), Shakira
 Main Spanish Breakthrough of the Year: Motel, Motel
 Latin Pop Male: México - Madrid: En Directo Y Sin Escalas, Alejandro Fernández
 Latin Pop Female: Indeleble, Alejandra Guzmán
 Latin Pop Group: Mundos Opuestos, Ha*Ash
 Latin Rock Soloist or Group: Motel, Motel
 Reggaeton Soloist or Group: Barrio Fino en Directo, Daddy Yankee
 Main English Record of the Year: Oral Fixation Vol. 2, Shakira
 Main English Song of the Year: Hips Don't Lie, Shakira
 Main English Breakthrough of the Year: Whatever People Say I Am, That's What I'm Not, Arctic Monkeys
 Popular Record of the Year: Mas Capaces que Nunca, K-Paz de la Sierra
 Popular Song of the Year: Mi Credo, K-Paz de la Sierra
 Popular Breakthrough of the Year: Erasmo: El Conde de Xalpatlahuac, Erasmo
 Popular Norteño Soloist or Group: Tu Sombra, Grupo Pesado
 Popular Grupero Soloist or Group: No Es Brujería, Ana Bárbara
 Popular Ranchero Soloist or Group: Tu Orgullo, Alicia Villarreal
 Popular Banda/Duranguense Soloist or Group: Mas Capaces que Nunca, K-Paz de la Sierra
 Popular Tropical Soloist or Group: Margarita Sinfónica, Margarita "La Diosa de la Cumbia"
 Video of the Year: Hips Don't Lie, Shakira
 Special Tribute to Trajectory: Marco Antonio Solís
 Premio Social a la Música: Día de Enero, Shakira

Special Awards
 People Choice Award: Alejandro Fernández
 Sales Award Spanish - Male: México - Madrid: En Directo Y Sin Escalas, Alejandro Fernández
 Sales Award Spanish - Female: La Voz de un Ángel, Yuridia
 Sales Award Popular: Fuego, A.B. Quintanilla & Kumbia Kings
 Sales Award English:  Monkey Business, The Black Eyed Peas

2007
 Main Spanish Record of the Year: Papito, Miguel Bosé
 Main Spanish Song of the Year: Te Lo Agradezco, Pero No, Alejandro Sanz & Shakira
 Main Spanish Breakthrough of the Year: Esta Es Mi Vida, Jesse & Joy
 Latin Pop Male: Viento a Favor, Alejandro Fernández
 Latin Pop Female: Utopía, Belinda
 Latin Pop Group: El Mundo Se Equivoca, La 5ª Estación
 Latin Rock Soloist or Group: Memo Rex Commander y el Corazón Atómico de la Vía Láctea, Zoé
 Main English Record of the Year: B'Day, Beyoncé
 Main English Song of the Year: Rudebox, Robbie Williams
 Main English Breakthrough of the Year: Alright, Still, Lily Allen
 Popular Record of the Year: Conquistando Corazones, K-Paz de la Sierra
 Popular Song of the Year: Por Amarte, Pepe Aguilar
 Popular Breakthrough of the Year: Destilando Amor, Angélica Rivera
 Popular Norteño Soloist or Group: Crossroads: Cruce de Caminos, Intocable
 Popular Grupero Soloist or Group: Trozos de Mi Alma, Vol. 2, Marco Antonio Solís
 Popular Ranchero Soloist or Group: Enamorado, Pepe Aguilar
 Popular Banda/Duranguense Soloist or Group: Conquistando Corazones, K-Paz de la Sierra
 Popular Tropical Soloist or Group: La Llave de Mi Corazón, Juan Luis Guerra
 Video of the Year: Me Muero, La 5ª Estación
 Special Tribute to Trajectory: Timbiriche
 Premio Social a la Música: Timbiriche

Special Awards
 Special Tribute to Trajectory: Yuri for 30 years
 Special Tribute to Trajectory: Los Joao for 35 years
 Award Básico 40: Aleks Syntek
 Award Ke Buena: Víctor García
 Best Selling Ringtone: Rompe, Daddy Yankee
 Best Selling Mastertone: Labios Compartidos, Maná

2008
 Main Spanish Record of the Year: Papitour, Miguel Bosé
 Main Spanish Song of the Year: Te Quiero, Nigga
 Main Spanish Breakthrough of the Year: Mediocre, Ximena Sariñana
 Latin Pop Male: La Vida Es Un Ratico, Juanes
 Latin Pop Female: Entre Mariposas, Yuridia
 Latin Pop Group: Fantasía Pop, Belanova
 Latin Rock Soloist or Group: Sino, Café Tacuba
 Main English Record of the Year: Hard Candy, Madonna
 Main English Song of the Year: 4 Minutes, Madonna
 Main English Breakthrough of the Year: Jonas Brothers, Jonas Brothers
 Popular Record of the Year: Para Siempre, Vicente Fernández
 Popular Song of the Year: Estos Celos, Vicente Fernández
 Popular Breakthrough of the Year: Pensando En Tí, Germán Montero
 Popular Norteño Soloist or Group: 2c, Intocable
 Popular Grupero Soloist or Group: Una Noche en Madrid, Marco Antonio Solís
 Popular Ranchero Soloist or Group: Para Siempre, Vicente Fernández
 Popular Banda/Duranguense Soloist or Group: Y Que Quede Claro, La Arrolladora Banda El Limón
 Popular Tropical Soloist or Group: Tentaciones, Margarita "La Diosa de la Cumbia"
 Video of the Year: Me Enamora, Juanes
 Soundtrack Theme: Fuego En La Sangre, Vicente Fernández
 Special Tribute to Trajectory: Miguel Bosé
 Premio Social a la Música: Kudai

Special Awards
 People's Choice Award: Pepe Aguilar

2009

 Main Spanish Record of the Year:
Aleks Syntek - 20 Años En Vivo
Calle 13 - Los de Atrás Vienen Conmigo
La Quinta Estación - Sin Frenos
Wisin & Yandel - La Revolución
Zoé - Reptilectric - Winner
 Main Spanish Song of the Year:
"Mañana Es Para Siempre" - Alejandro Fernández
"Te Amo" - Alexander Acha
"No Hay Nadie Como Tú" -  Calle 13 feat. Café Tacvba
"Tu No Eres Para Mí" - Fanny Lú
"No Me Doy Por Vencido" - Luis Fonsi - Winner
 Main Spanish Breakthrough of the Year:
Alexander Acha - Winner
Beto Cuevas
Paty Cantú
Tush
Victor & Leo
 Latin Pop Male:
Aleks Syntek
Chayanne
Luis Fonsi - Winner
Reily
Alexander Acha
 Latin Pop Female:
Laura Pausini
Natalia Lafourcade
Fanny Lú
María José - Winner
Paty Cantú
 Latin Pop Group:
Belanova
Calle 13
Ha*Ash
La Quinta Estación - Winner
Wisin & Yandel
 Latin Rock Soloist or Group:
Babasónicos
Kinky
Zoé - Winner
Moderatto
Beto Cuevas
 Main English Record of the Year:
I Am... Sasha Fierce - Beyoncé
Circus - Britney Spears
The Fame -  Lady Gaga - Winner
No Line on the Horizon - U2
Prospekt's March EP - Coldplay
 Main English Song of the Year:
"Single Ladies (Put a Ring on It)" - Beyoncé
"Womanizer" - Britney Spears
"Life In Technicolor" - Coldplay
"Poker Face" - Lady Gaga - Winner
"Get On Your Boots" - U2
 'Main English Breakthrough of the Year:
Demi Lovato
Katy Perry
Lady Gaga - Winner
The Ting Tings
The Veronicas
Video of The Year:
"Te Amo" - Alexander Acha
"Te Presumo" - Banda El Recodo de Don Cruz Lizárraga
Tu No Eres Para Mí" - Fanny Lú
Causa y Efecto - Paulina Rubio
Reptilectric - Zoé - Winner
Soundtrack Theme:
"Mundo de Caramelo" - Danna Paola - Winner
"En Cambio No" - Laura Pausini
"Juro Que Te Amo" - David Bisbal
"Mañana Es Para Siempre" - Alejandro Fernández
"Quiero Que Me Quieras" - Gael García Bernal
"Un Gancho Al Corazón" - Playa Limbo

2012
 Main Spanish Record of the Year: MTV Unplugged/Música de Fondo, Zoé
 Main Spanish Song of the Year: Labios Rotos, Zoé
 Main Spanish Breakthrough of the Year: Al Fin Te Encontré, Río Roma
 Latin Pop Male: Viva el Príncipe, Cristian Castro
 Latin Pop Female: 20 Años de Éxitos En Vivo con Moderatto, Alejandra Guzmán
 Latin Pop Group: A Tiempo, Ha*Ash
 Latin Rock Soloist or Group: MTV Unplugged/Música de Fondo, Zoé
 Latin Rock Breakthrough: Remando, Saúl Hernández
 Latin Soloist or Group: 30 años de cumbia, Margarita La Diosa de la Cumbia
 Urban Soloist or Group: Entren Los Que Quieran, Calle 13
 Main English Record of the Year: 21, Adele
 Popular Record of the Year: MTV Unplugged: Los Tigres del Norte and Friends, Los Tigres del Norte
 Popular Song of the Year: A Dónde Vamos a Parar, Marco Antonio Solís
 Popular Breakthrough of the Year: Prisionero de tus brazos, Beto Zapata
 Popular Norteño Soloist or Group: MTV Unplugged: Los Tigres del Norte and Friends, Los Tigres del Norte
 Popular Grupero Soloist or Group: En Total Plenitud, Marco Antonio Solís
 Popular Ranchero Soloist or Group: El Hombre Que Más Te Amó, Vicente Fernández
 Popular Banda/Duranguense Soloist or Group: Del Rancho Para el Mundo, Espinoza Paz
 Soundtrack Theme: Día de Suerte, Alejandra Guzmán
 Special Tribute to Trajectory: Chayanne & Emmanuel
 Premio Social a la Música: Margarita La Diosa de la Cumbia

Special Awards
 Best songwriters: Lola Beltrán, Pedro Infante, Luis Pérez Meza, Don Cruz Lizárraga & José Ángel Espinoza

2013
 Main Spanish Record of the Year: ¿Con Quien Se Queda El Perro?, Jesse & Joy
 Main Spanish Song of the Year: Corre, Jesse & Joy
 Main Spanish Breakthrough of the Year: Na Balada, Michel Teló
 Main Spanish Contemporary Artist: Pecados y milagros, Lila Downs
 Latin Pop Male: La Música No Se Toca, Alejandro Sanz
 Latin Pop Female: Mujer Divina – Homenaje a Agustín Lara, Natalia Lafourcade
 Latin Pop Group: ¿Con Quien Se Queda El Perro?, Jesse & Joy
 Latin Rock Soloist or Group: El Objeto Antes Llamado Disco, Café Tacuba
 Electronic Soloist or Group: 'Inténtalo, 3Ball MTY
 Latin Soloist or Group: Pecados y milagros, Lila Downs
 Urban Soloist or Group: 'Inténtalo, 3Ball MTY
 Main English Record of the Year: Live at the Royal Albert Hall, Adele
 Main English Song of the Year: Diamonds, Rihanna
 Popular Record of the Year: Joyas Prestadas, Jenni Rivera
 Popular Song of the Year: Un Hombre Normal, Espinoza Paz
 Popular Breakthrough of the Year: Inténtalo, 3Ball MTY
 Popular Norteño Soloist or Group: Mi Promesa, Grupo Pesado
 Popular Ranchero Soloist or Group: Otra Vez, Vicente Fernández
 Popular Banda/Duranguense Soloist or Group: Joyas Prestadas, Jenni Rivera
 Soundtrack Theme: No Me Compares, Alejandro Sanz
 Special Tribute to Trajectory: Manuel Mijares
 Premio Social a la Música: Emmanuel
 Artist of the Year: Alejandro Sanz

Special Awards
 People's Choice Award: Alejandro Sanz
 Premio Disco Concepto y Gira del Año: Sasha, Benny y Erik

See also

References

Mexican music awards
Latin American music awards
Lists of award winners
Awards established in 2002